Mpho Ndumo (born 15 January 1997) is a South African cricketer. He made his first-class debut for KwaZulu-Natal Inland in the 2017–18 Sunfoil 3-Day Cup on 1 February  2018. He made his List A debut on 15 March 2020, for KwaZulu-Natal Inland in the 2019–20 CSA Provincial One-Day Challenge.

References

External links
 

1997 births
Living people
South African cricketers
KwaZulu-Natal Inland cricketers
Place of birth missing (living people)